Mgarr United F.C. is a Maltese Football Club, based in the small village of Mgarr. They earned relegation after finishing 10th in the Maltese Challenge League B and will play in the Maltese National Amateur League from the 2022-23 season. The club was founded in 1967 following the dissolution of Mgarr Eagles F.C. The club's first success came in 2006–2007 when they won the BOV Third Division. In 2018–2019 the club managed to reach the Second Division play off final but lost to Vittoriosa Stars 3–2 in extra time.

Current squad

External links
Mgarr United official website (Maltese and English).

Association football clubs established in 1967
Football clubs in Malta
1967 establishments in Malta
Mġarr